Events in the year 2003 in China.

Incumbents 
 Party General Secretary - Hu Jintao
 President – Jiang Zemin to March 15, Hu Jintao
 Premier – Zhu Rongji to March 16, Wen Jiabao
 Vice President – Hu Jintao to March 15, Zeng Qinghong
 Vice Premier – Li Lanqing to March 6, Huang Ju
 Congress Chairman - Li Peng to March 15, Wu Bangguo
 Conference Chairman - Li Ruihuan to March 14, Jia Qinglin

Governors 
 Governor of Anhui Province – Wang Jinshan
 Governor of Fujian Province – Lu Zhangong
 Governor of Gansu Province – Lu Hao 
 Governor of Guangdong Province – Lu Ruihua then Huang Huahua 
 Governor of Guizhou Province – Shi Xiushi 
 Governor of Hainan Province – Wang Xiaofeng then Wei Liucheng 
 Governor of Hebei Province – Ji Yunshi 
 Governor of Heilongjiang Province – Song Fatang then Zhang Zuoji
 Governor of Henan Province – Li Keqiang then Li Chengyu 
 Governor of Hubei Province – Luo Qingquan 
 Governor of Hunan Province – Zhang Yunchuan then Zhou Bohua
 Governor of Jiangsu Province – Liang Baohua 
 Governor of Jiangxi Province – Huang Zhiquan 
 Governor of Jilin Province – Wang Min (until December), Han Changfu (starting December)
 Governor of Liaoning Province – Bo Xilai 
 Governor of Qinghai Province – Song Xiuyan 
 Governor of Shaanxi Province – Jia Zhibang
 Governor of Shandong Province – Zhang Gaoli then Han Yuqun 
 Governor of Shanxi Province – Liu Zhenhua 
 Governor of Sichuan Province – Zhang Zhongwei 
 Governor of Yunnan Province – Xu Rongkai 
 Governor of Zhejiang Province – Xi Jinping (until January), Lü Zushan (starting January)

Events

January
 January 7 to January 8 – Hefei student protests occur, marking the largest student protests since the Tiananmen Square protests of 1989.

February
 February 24 – 2003 Bachu earthquake: An earthquake measuring 6.3 in magnitude occurred in the Xinjiang Autonomous Region in northwest China, killing 191 people and 291 hospitalised. Almost 10,000 homes were leveled by the earthquake.

March
 March 14 – A smartphone and portable audio player brand, Meizu was founded by Jack Wong in Zhuhai, Guangdong Province.
 March 15 – Hu Jintao becomes President of the People's Republic of China, replacing Jiang Zemin.

June
 June 1 – The People's Republic of China begins filling the lake behind the massive Three Gorges Dam, raising the water level near the dam over 100 meters.

October
 October 15 – China successfully launches Shenzhou 5, their first manned space mission, becoming the third country in the world to have independent human spaceflight capability after the Soviet Union and the United States.

December
 December 23 - A PetroChina Chuandongbei natural gas field explosion in Chongqing, 234 people lives.

Deaths
 February 11 – Ma Sanli, Chinese comedian (born 1914)
 March 17 – Su Buqing, Chinese mathematician and educator (born 1902)
 April 1 – Zhang Guorong, Cantonese singer and actor (born 1956)
 June 17 – Zheng Wenguang, science fiction author (born 1929)
 July 5 – Zhang Aiping, Chinese communist military leader (born 1908)
 October 25 – Yao Guang, diplomat, foreign ambassador (born 1921)
 November 15 – T. Y. Lin, Chinese-born civil engineer (born 1912)
 November 19 – Shi Zhecun, Chinese author (born 1905)
 December 27 – Ying Ruocheng,  Chinese actor, director, playwright and Vice Minister of Culture from 1986 to 1990 (born 1929)

See also 
 List of Chinese films of 2003
 Hong Kong League Cup 2003–04

References 

 
Years of the 21st century in China
2000s in China
China
China